Stormy Petrel is an early Australian television drama. A period drama, the 12-episode serial told the story of William Bligh and aired in 1960 on ABC. It was the first live TV serial from the ABC.

It was based on a script by Rex Rienits adapted from his 1948 radio serial. The radio serial was rebroadcast in 1953.

Stormy Petrel was a critical and popular success and led to the ABC making a number of period drama series set in Australia's past: The Outcasts (1961), The Patriots (1962), and The Hungry Ones (1963). It also inspired ATN-7, a commercial station, to make Jonah (1962). Telerecordings (also known as Kinescope recordings) of Stormy Petrel are held by National Archives of Australia.

Premise
The story of William Blighs' governorship of New South Wales leading up to the events of the Rum Rebellion.

Cast
Brian James as William Bligh
Walter Sullivan as John MacArthur
Delia Williams as Mary Bligh, Bligh's daughter
Ric Hutton as John Putland
Nigel Lovell as Major Johnston
Muriel Steinbeck as Mrs Bligh
Margo Lee as Elizabeth MacArthur
Alistair Duncan
Richard Perry
Charles McCallum as the Minister
Annette Andre as Ann Bligh
Elizabeth Waterhouse as Elizabeth Bligh
Moray Powell as Dr Warren
Geoffrey King as Sir Joseph Banks
Owen Weingott
Nat Levison
Charles McCallum
Walter Pym as Lt-Gen Keppel

Radio play
The series was based on a radio play which Rex Rienits had written in 1948. Rienits said he believed Bligh "was a great man." He later said that Bligh had "been grossly maligned" and "that Hollywood did a terrible thing in representing him, in the person of Mr.
Laughton, as a cruel and brutal despot... However, Bligh undoubtedly
had a quick and blustering temper, and it was this temper, rather than any deep-seated viciousness that got him into trouble,both on the 'Bounty' and as Governor of New South Wales'".

The story of Bligh was told through the eyes of his wife Elizabeth, then John Hallet, then his daughter Mary. It went for seventy episodes.

The play was a great success when broadcast. Rienits sold it to the BBC and the ABC rebroadcast it in 1953.

The play was broadcast again on radio in 1959.

TV Production
Early Australian TV drama production was dominated by using imported scripts but Stormy Petrel was made when the ABC was undertaking what has been described as "an Australiana" drive.

It was directed by Colin Dean who called the Rum Rebellion "virtually the colony's first revolt against what was thought to be the tyranny of government vested in the person of the Governor himself."

The sets were designed by Douglas Smith who was on staff at the ABC; he started working on them in December 1959. Smith says it was difficult to get sets to be authentic as while there were plenty of written descriptions there were few pictures so he had to source the latter from the army records in London.

Annette Andre played one of Bligh's daughters. A radio historian said Sullivan "gave the performance of his career" in the show.

Episodes
Ep 1 "The Assignment" – 15 May (Syd), 29 May (Melb), 26 Jun (Brisb) – Captain William Blight is opposed to his daughter Mary marrying John Putland. Sir Joseph Banks offers Bligh the governorship of NSW.
Ep 2 "The Voyage Out" 22 May (Syd), 5 Jun (Melb) – Bligh takes the boat to Australia with his daughter Mary and her husband Lt. Putland.
Ep 3 "The Arrival" – 29 May (Syd), 12 Jun (Melb) – Bligh, his daughter Mary and Lt Putland arrive in Sydney, they meet MacArthur and his wife.
Ep 4 "Enter John MacArthur" – 5 Jun (Syd), 19 Jun (Melb)
Ep 5 "Storm Clouds" – 12 Jun (Syd), 26 Jun (Melb)
Ep 6 "The Challenge" – 19 Jun (Syd), 3 July (Melb)
Ep 7 "The First Skirmish" – 26 Jun (Syd), 10 July (Melb)
Ep 8 "The Storm Gathers" – 3 July (Syd), 17 July (Melb) – Bligh clashes with MacArthur in a second court action
Ep 9 "The Storm Breaks" – 10 July (Syd), 24 July (Melb)
Ep 10 "Rebellion" – 17 July (Syd), 31 July (Melb)
Ep 11 ' Aftermath" – 24 July (Syd), 7 Aug (Melb)
Ep 12 "The Way Back" – 31 July (Syd), 14 Aug (Melb) – final episode – Bligh returns to England to give evidence at the court martial of Major Johnston. Bligh's widowed daughter Mary becomes betrothed to Macquarie's aide, Maurice O'Connell, while Bligh's secretary, Griffin, who loves Mary, looks on. Bligh is appointed Admiral.

Reception

Critical
Coming at a time when Australia produced few dramatic television series, The Age called it a "successful serial" and commented "These colorful – and factual – Australian series are a "must" for Australian television."

The Sunday Sydney Morning Herald called it "first rate entertainment."

At the end of the series' run The Age called it "Channel 2's most consistent production... stands head and shoulders above all other Australian-produced drama series."

The Woman's Weekly said Dean was to be "congratulated on a production (made difficult, I'm sure, by budget-balancing) marked by a simplicity that has been the trademark of some of the
B.B.C. adaptations of famous classics. You may cock a snoot at Australian history, but "Stormy Petrel" makes Australian history come alive in absorbing TV." At the end of the series' run the Woman's Weekly called it "an outstanding production."

Ratings
According to director Colin Dean "I got the results from Audience Research – the average audience for Stormy Petrel was the same as a years run in her Majesty's Theatre including matinees. I thought to myself – that is unbelievable. That is what we have been missing. We never had audiences like that before. What a great thing we done!"

It was repeated by the ABC in 1974.

Sequel
In November 1960 it was announced that Rex Rienits and Colin Dean would reunite on a sequel that would focus on William Redfern but feature many characters from Stormy Petrel.

Novel
Rienits wrote up the story as a novel, Stormy Petrel, which was published in 1963. The London Sunday Times said "narrative swings along until Bligh and MacArthur sink with all hands in a bog of litigation."

References

External links
 
 Stormy Petrel at AustLit
Stormy Petrel at National Film and Sound Archive
Clip of trailer at National Archives of Australia

Australian drama television series
1960 Australian television series debuts
1960 Australian television series endings
Australian Broadcasting Corporation original programming
Black-and-white Australian television shows
English-language television shows
Television series set in the 18th century
Television shows set in colonial Australia